The brown-backed scrub robin (Cercotrichas hartlaubi) is a species of bird in the family Muscicapidae.
It is found in Angola, Burundi, Cameroon, Central African Republic, Democratic Republic of the Congo, Kenya, Nigeria, Rwanda, Tanzania, and Uganda.
Its natural habitat is moist savanna.

References

brown-backed scrub robin
Birds of Central Africa
brown-backed scrub robin
Taxonomy articles created by Polbot